Pandit Indra Chandra was a prominent lyricist of India's Hindi language films from the 1930s through the 1950s. He wrote lyrics for 913 songs in 132 films. Including Mr. Sampat (1952) and Bahut Din Huwe (1954).

Career

References

External links

Hindi-language lyricists
Indian lyricists
Year of birth missing
Year of death missing